Yobes Ondieki (born February 21, 1961, in Kisii, Nyanza) is a Kenyan former 5000 m runner, who won the World Championships' gold medal in Tokyo 1991. In the same year he set a temporary Kenyan 5000 m record of 13:01.82 in Zurich. He participated in the Olympic finals of 1988 and 1992 but did not win a medal. He also was the first person to break 27:00 in the 10,000 m in 1993 with a then world record time of 26:58.38.

Biography
Ondieki attended Iowa State University where he captured four Big Eight conference titles, three of them in cross country. Ondieki received All-America accolades six times at Iowa State. Although he never won an NCAA individual championship, he came close on several occasions, earning NCAA runner-up honors three times and third-place status three times. Except for the NCAA championship, he won every cross country meet he competed in during the 1983 and 1984 seasons.

Ondieki was known for his demanding training sessions and his ability to run constantly at a high pace. However, he lacked a finishing kick, a weakness exploited by his opponents in the 1992 Olympic 5,000 m final in Barcelona. In 1993, Ondieki became the first athlete to break the 27-minute barrier over 10,000 meters when he ran a world record time of 26:58.38 at the Bislett Games in Oslo on July 10. His time broke the mark set by Richard Chelimo only five days earlier in Stockholm by over 9 seconds.

From 1989 to 1993, Ondieki was ranked in the top 5 in the world in the 5,000 meters by Track & Field News, with his number one ranking coming in 1991. In 1993, Track & Field News ranked him number one in the world in the 10,000 meters.

Ondieki married Lisa Martin, an Australian marathon runner. In 1990 they had a baby girl named Emma Ondieki. Today, Ondieki and Martin are divorced.

In September 1991 both he and Martin attended the 1991 AFL Grand Final as a part of the prematch entertainment. The vision of Ondieki laughing uncontrollably at the antics of Angry Anderson has been used in a more recent advertisement for Carlton Draught.

References

External links

1961 births
Living people
Kenyan male middle-distance runners
Kenyan male long-distance runners
Athletes (track and field) at the 1988 Summer Olympics
Athletes (track and field) at the 1992 Summer Olympics
Olympic athletes of Kenya
World Athletics Championships medalists
Athletes (track and field) at the 1990 Commonwealth Games
Commonwealth Games competitors for Kenya
World Athletics Championships winners